The Daltons Ride Again is a 1945 American Western film directed by Ray Taylor starring Alan Curtis, Lon Chaney Jr., Kent Taylor and Noah Beery Jr. The movie was made by Universal Pictures and the supporting cast features Milburn Stone ("Doc" in the subsequent television series Gunsmoke) and Douglas Dumbrille.

Plot

Cast
 Alan Curtis as Emmett Dalton, a Brother
 Lon Chaney Jr. as Grat Dalton, a Brother
 Kent Taylor as Bob Dalton, a Brother
 Noah Beery Jr. as Ben Dalton, a Brother
 Martha O'Driscoll as Mary Bohannon, Emmett's girlfriend
 Jess Barker as Jeff Colton
 Thomas Gomez as 'Professor' J. K. McKenna, the Town drunk
 John Litel as Mitchael J. 'Mike" Bohannon, the Newspaper editor
 Milburn Stone as Parker W. Graham, a Land developer / bad guy
 Walter Sande as Wilkins / bad guy
 Douglass Dumbrille as Sheriff Hoskins
 Stanley Andrews as Tex Walters, the Dalton's friend

Critical reception
Critic John Howard Reid called it "a handsome little oater with good performances and a fine violent shootout as its climax."

References

External links

 
 

1945 films
1945 Western (genre) films
American black-and-white films
American Western (genre) films
Revisionist Western (genre) films
Films directed by Ray Taylor
1940s American films